South Mount Cameron is a rural locality in the local government area (LGA) of Dorset in the North-east LGA region of Tasmania. The 2016 census recorded a population of 15 for the state suburb of South Mount Cameron.

History 
South Mount Cameron was gazetted as a locality in 1969. 

The area was originally settled as a tin-mining town.

Geography
The Ringarooma River flows through from south to north-east.

Road infrastructure 
Route B82 (Gladstone Road) passes through from south to north-east.

References

Towns in Tasmania
Localities of Dorset Council (Australia)